The 2020-21 Bentley Falcons men's ice hockey season was the 44th season of play for the program, the 22nd at the Division I level, and the 18th season in the Atlantic Hockey conference. The Falcons represented Bentley University and were coached by Ryan Soderquist, in his 19th season.

Season
As a result of the ongoing COVID-19 pandemic the entire college ice hockey season was delayed. Because the NCAA had previously announced that all winter sports athletes would retain whatever eligibility they possessed through at least the following year, none of Bentley's players would lose a season of play. However, the NCAA also approved a change in its transfer regulations that would allow players to transfer and play immediately rather than having to sit out a season, as the rules previously required.

Bentley didn't play well in the first month of the season, beginning 1–5. After a COVID-19-extended break, the Falcons returned to the ice in late January and won consecutive games. Their good play didn't last, however, and the team followed the mini-resurgence with five straight losses. Despite a poor record, Bentley was the host to start the Atlantic Hockey Tournament. The Falcons played Air Force and won decisively, 7–3. As the team was preparing to take on top seed American International, Bentley University began to see a surge in positive COVID cases. Due the school's protocols, Bentley withdrew from the remainder of the tournament on March 11 and ended their season.

Departures

Recruiting

Roster
As of October 14, 2020.

|}

Standings

Schedule and Results

|-
!colspan=12 style=";" | Regular Season

|-
!colspan=12 style=";" | 

|- align="center" bgcolor="#e0e0e0"
|colspan=12|Withdrew from Tournament

Scoring statistics

Goaltending statistics

Rankings

USCHO did not release a poll in week 20.

Awards and honors

References

2020–21
2020–21 Atlantic Hockey men's ice hockey season
2020–21 NCAA Division I men's ice hockey by team
2020–21 in American ice hockey by team
2021 in sports in Massachusetts
2020 in sports in Massachusetts